Glenea gardneriana is a species of beetle in the family Cerambycidae. It was described by Stephan von Breuning in 1958. It is known from Laos, India, China, and Myanmar.

References

gardneriana
Beetles described in 1958